Duncan Dalnajeneso Danagogo Dokiwari (born 15 October 1973 in Port Harcourt) is a retired Nigerian boxer. At the 1996 Summer Olympics he won a Men's Super Heavyweight bronze medal, together with Aleksei Lezin of Russia.

Background
Dokiwari is a descendant of the Kalabari people of the Niger Delta of Rivers State, Nigeria. He is a son of the Horsfall and David-West group of houses in Buguma, in the Asaritoru Local Government Area of Rivers State.
Dokiwari is the fifth of eight children raised by their mother and grandmother. As a child Dokiwari played different sports ranging from track and fields, soccer, badminton, powerlifting, to volleyball which has been evident in his agility and strength as a boxer.
The young Dokiwari obtained his primary education at Port Harcout Primary School in Port Harcourt, Nigeria. On a successful completion of his primary education, Dokiwari attended Akpor Grammar School Ozuoba, where he completed his secondary education. 
Duncan Dokiwari graduated with degrees in criminal justice and Advertising from the University of Nevada, Las Vegas in the summer of 2008. Dokiwari is an avid reader whose reading interest include philosophy, history, English literature, law and justice, as well as religious literature.

Amateur career 
Dokiwari came out of the same Nigerian amateur boxing program that produced the likes of Peter Konyegwache, David Izon, Richard Igbeneghu, Ike Ibeabuchi, and Friday Ahunanya.
As a boxer Dokiwari was a late comer to the sport. He did not lace a pair of gloves until months after his eighteenth birthday. Within a span of 5 years from 1991 through 1996 Dokiwari rose from a virtually unknown in Nigerian boxing circle to become the country's foremost amateur boxing star. Dokiwari won the prestigious Eagle Belt champion of champions title consecutively between 1994 and 1995 in Lagos, Nigeria. Between 1993 through 1996 Duncan was Nigerian super heavyweight champion.
In 1994, Dokiwari won the gold medal at the 1994 Commonwealth Games in Victoria, Canada. A year later he defeated the Cubans in Cuba by winning the gold medal at the Guama Cup International Boxing Championships. Also in 1995, he was proclaimed the African Boxer of the Year after winning the title at the African Games in Harare, Zimbabwe, where he knocked out all his opponents in the first round.

Gold Medalist at the 1994 Commonwealth Games in Victoria, Australia.
Emilio Leti (Samoa) won by TKO 1
Danny Williams (England) won on points
David Anyim (Kenya) won on points
Represented Nigeria as a Super Heavyweight at the 1996 Atlanta Olympic Games.
Mohammad Reza Samadi (Iran) won by TKO 2
Safarish Khan (Pakistan) won by TKO 2
Adalat Mamedov (Azerbaijan) won by TKO 3
Paea Wolfgramm (Tonga) lost on points, this was a semi-final match, and with the loss Dokiwari won a bronze medal.

Professional career 
Dokiwari's boxing career has been plagued with disputes with promoters and managers since turning professional in July 1997.  Dokiwari's boxing skill has been honed by reputable trainer such as Eddie Futch, Thell Torrence, and Mike McCallum. Duncan dropped a decision to Fres Oquendo early in his career, and after running off 10 consecutive victories, dropped a unanimous decision to Dominick Guinn.  A year after the loss to Guinn, Dokiwari was stunningly TKO'd in the first by unknown Stacy Frazier.  Despite the loss, he continued his boxing career recording impressive wins against tough opposition. In December 2006 Dokiwari won the WBC USNBC Heavyweight title with an impressive 4th-round knockout of strong and durable Wllie Palms in Laughlin, Nevada. With the victory Dokiwari became the first man to stop Palms.
Speculations about Dokiwari's retirement has been greatly exaggerated. Dokiwari has been diligently practicing in anticipation of a return to the ring in the fall. 
Outside the ring Dokiwari was also featured in the motion picture "Undisputed" with Wesley Snipes and Ving Rhames.

Professional boxing record

|-
|align="center" colspan=8|25 Wins (22 knockouts, 3 decisions), 3 Losses (1 knockout, 2 decisions) 
|-
| align="center" style="border-style: none none solid solid; background: #e3e3e3"|Result
| align="center" style="border-style: none none solid solid; background: #e3e3e3"|Record
| align="center" style="border-style: none none solid solid; background: #e3e3e3"|Opponent
| align="center" style="border-style: none none solid solid; background: #e3e3e3"|Type
| align="center" style="border-style: none none solid solid; background: #e3e3e3"|Round
| align="center" style="border-style: none none solid solid; background: #e3e3e3"|Date
| align="center" style="border-style: none none solid solid; background: #e3e3e3"|Location
| align="center" style="border-style: none none solid solid; background: #e3e3e3"|Notes
|-align=center
|Win
|
|align=left| Willie Palms
|TKO
|4
|01/12/2006
|align=left| Avi Resort & Casino, Laughlin, Nevada
|align=left|
|-
|Win
|
|align=left| Kerry Biles
|KO
|2
|08/10/2006
|align=left| Marriott Arena, Junction City, Kansas
|align=left|
|-
|Win
|
|align=left| Patrick Smith
|KO
|2
|26/08/2006
|align=left| Junction City Convention Center, Junction City, Kansas
|align=left|
|-
|Loss
|
|align=left| Stacy Frazier
|TKO
|1
|02/10/2004
|align=left| Caesars Palace, Las Vegas, Nevada
|align=left|
|-
|Loss
|
|align=left| Dominick Guinn
|UD
|10
|27/09/2003
|align=left| HSBC Arena, Buffalo, New York
|align=left|
|-
|Win
|
|align=left| Carlton Johnson
|TKO
|3
|26/04/2003
|align=left| Foxwoods, Mashantucket, Connecticut
|align=left|
|-
|Win
|
|align=left| Andy Sample
|TKO
|1
|07/11/2002
|align=left| Centennial Garden, Bakersfield, California
|align=left|
|-
|Win
|
|align=left| Tali Kulihaapai
|TKO
|1
|16/10/2002
|align=left| Marriott Hotel, Irvine, California
|align=left|
|-
|Win
|
|align=left| Armando "Angel" Rodriguez
|TKO
|2
|26/09/2002
|align=left| Compaq Center, San Jose, California
|align=left|
|-
|Win
|
|align=left| David Vedder
|UD
|8
|08/08/2002
|align=left| Centennial Garden, Bakersfield, California
|align=left|
|-
|Win
|
|align=left| Tim Knight
|KO
|5
|20/07/2002
|align=left| Conseco Fieldhouse, Indianapolis, Indiana
|align=left|
|-
|Win
|
|align=left| Mike Sedillo
|KO
|2
|27/06/2002
|align=left| Marriott Hotel, Irvine, California
|align=left|
|-
|Win
|
|align=left| Agustin Corpus
|UD
|6
|23/10/1999
|align=left| MGM Grand Garden Arena, Las Vegas, Nevada
|align=left|
|-
|Win
|
|align=left| Matthew Brooks
|TKO
|1
|25/07/1999
|align=left| Harrah's Casino, Kansas City, Missouri
|align=left|
|-
|Win
|
|align=left| Clement Hassan
|TKO
|1
|03/04/1999
|align=left| The New Frontier, Las Vegas, Nevada
|align=left|
|-
|Loss
|
|align=left| Fres Oquendo
|UD
|6
|16/01/1999
|align=left| MGM Grand Garden Arena, Las Vegas, Nevada
|align=left|
|-
|Win
|
|align=left| Miguel Otero Ocasio
|UD
|4
|03/12/1998
|align=left| Casino Magic, Bay Saint Louis, Mississippi
|align=left|
|-
|Win
|
|align=left| Rowyan Wallace
|TKO
|1
|23/10/1998
|align=left| Trump Marina, Atlantic City, New Jersey
|align=left|
|-
|Win
|
|align=left| Otis Tisdale
|KO
|1
|19/05/1998
|align=left| Corpus Christi Memorial Coliseum, Corpus Christi, Texas
|align=left|
|-
|Win
|
|align=left| Larry Cureton
|KO
|1
|17/04/1998
|align=left| Mohegan Sun, Uncasville, Connecticut
|align=left|
|-
|Win
|
|align=left| Joseph Kenneth Reyes
|TKO
|1
|31/01/1998
|align=left| Trump Taj Majal, Atlantic City, New Jersey
|align=left|
|-
|Win
|
|align=left| Mike Middleton
|TKO
|1
|18/11/1997
|align=left| Show Place Arena, Upper Marlboro, Maryland
|align=left|
|-
|Win
|
|align=left| Doug Phillips
|TKO
|1
|03/10/1997
|align=left| The Tropicana, Atlantic City, New Jersey
|align=left|
|-
|Win
|
|align=left| Derrick Edwards
|KO
|1
|12/09/1997
|align=left| Pikesville Armory, Pikesville, Maryland
|align=left|
|-
|Win
|
|align=left| Jesse Shaw
|KO
|1
|23/08/1997
|align=left| Wild Wild West Casino, Atlantic City, New Jersey
|align=left|
|-
|Win
|
|align=left| Donnell Cummings
|TKO
|1
|09/08/1997
|align=left| South Padre Island, Texas
|align=left|
|-
|Win
|
|align=left| Shidevin Brown
|TKO
|2
|20/07/1997
|align=left| Fantasy Springs Resort Casino, Indio, California
|align=left|
|-
|Win
|
|align=left| Stanley Wooten
|KO
|1
|05/07/1997
|align=left| MARK of the Quad Cities, Moline, Illinois
|align=left|
|}

External links
 
 
 
 

1972 births
Living people
Nigerian male boxers
Super-heavyweight boxers
Olympic boxers of Nigeria
Olympic bronze medalists for Nigeria
Olympic medalists in boxing
Boxers at the 1996 Summer Olympics
Medalists at the 1996 Summer Olympics
Commonwealth Games gold medallists for Nigeria
Commonwealth Games medallists in boxing
Boxers at the 1994 Commonwealth Games
African Games gold medalists for Nigeria
African Games medalists in boxing
Sportspeople from Port Harcourt
Competitors at the 1995 All-Africa Games
Medallists at the 1994 Commonwealth Games